Carl Moos, otherwise Karl Franz Moos (29 October 1878 – 9 July 1959), was a German and Swiss artist and illustrator, notable for his Art Deco travel and sporting posters, particularly of skiing.

Life
Moos was born in Munich in Bavaria, Germany, the son of Franz Moos, a portrait painter. He trained in commercial art in Munich and worked as an illustrator for, among others, the Münchener Tagespresse. He also established himself as a creator of postcards and posters.

He was a member of the Munich commercial artists' group Die Sechs, together with Friedrich Heubner, Valentin Zietara, Emil Preetorius, Max Schwarzer and Franz Paul Glass, which aimed to improve the standing of advertising and poster graphics.

In World War I he left Munich and in 1915 settled in Zurich in Switzerland, where he spent the rest of his life. He continued his career as a successful freelance artist, also developing his poster work in the vanguard of the Swiss poster movement begun by Johannes Handschin. From 1928 to 1933 he worked as artistic director of the Art Institut Orell Füssli.

In 1928 he won a silver medal for Switzerland in the art competitions of the Amsterdam Olympic Games for his poster "Leichtathletisches Plakat".

His many travel and sporting posters, particularly of skiing and ski resorts, are highly sought after in the art market.

References

Further reading
W. Rotzler et al., Das Plakat in der Schweiz, 1990

External links
 Oxford Art Online: Bénézit Dictionary of Art: Carl Moos (access by subscription only)
 profile
 Silbermedallie für Sportposter
 Plakatbeispiel C. Wagner Sportartikel
 Posterbeispiel Massgeschäft
Posterbeispiel
Olympiade 1928 Silbermedaillegewinner bei Kunst Wettbewerb

1878 births
1959 deaths
Swiss artists
20th-century German artists
Swiss poster artists
Olympic silver medalists in art competitions
Olympic competitors in art competitions
Medalists at the 1928 Summer Olympics
Olympic silver medalists for Switzerland
German emigrants to Switzerland